Refuge Prarayer is a refuge in the Alps in Aosta Valley, Italy, at an altitude of 2005 metres.

Mountain huts in the Alps
Mountain huts in Italy